The 1926 Frankford Yellow Jackets season was their third in the National Football League. The team improved on their previous output of 10–4, winning fourteen games. By virtue of their league-best record of 14–1–2, they were crowned the 1926 NFL Champions. The 1926 Yellow Jackets are the last NFL franchise to win a championship, and later go defunct.

Incidentally, the champions of the rival American Football League that year were also based in Philadelphia, the Philadelphia Quakers. There had been some brief discussion of fulfilling the crosstown rivalry by staging an interleague championship between the Quakers and Yellow Jackets, but the Yellow Jackets declined. (The Quakers instead played the seventh-place New York Giants, losing 31–0.)

Schedule

Standings

References

Frankford Yellow Jackets seasons
Frankford Yellow Jackets
National Football League championship seasons